The Minister of State is a 1997 Nordic comedy film directed by Paul-Anders Simma. It was entered into the 20th Moscow International Film Festival.

Cast
 Anna Maria Blind as Anne-Marja
 Mikkel Gaup as Ante
 Peo Grape as Evil Erkki
 Rolf Jenner as Cruel Gustu
 Erik Kiviniemi as Seppo Rävmark
 Peter Kneip as German Officer
 Soli Labbart as Thin Anna
 Esko Nikkari as Judge
 Sara Margrethe Oskal as Marit Jaha
 Sverre Porsanger as Johan Jaha
 Wimme Saari as Jojken
 Iisko Sara as Angry Piette
 Anitta Suikkari as Mrs. Neia
 Bjørn Sundquist as Antti Neia
 Kari-Pekka Toivonen as Otto Swinskjöld

References

External links
 
 

1997 films
1997 comedy films
1990s Finnish-language films
1990s Norwegian-language films
Sámi-language films
1990s Swedish-language films
Finnish multilingual films
Norwegian multilingual films
Swedish multilingual films
1997 multilingual films